Ashim Kumar Majhi, is an Indian politician, born in  Jirat, Hooghly was elected as MLA of Balagarh Vidhan Sabha Constituency in West Bengal Legislative Assembly in 2011 and 2016, as an All India Trinamool Congress candidate.

References

Living people
Trinamool Congress politicians from West Bengal
West Bengal MLAs 2016–2021
West Bengal MLAs 2011–2016
1963 births